Maolán Buí (Irish for "yellow/golden round knoll"), also known by the name Bearna Rua, at  high, is the fifth-highest peak in Ireland on the Arderin list, or the sixth-highest peak in Ireland according to the Vandeleur-Lynam list.  Maolán Buí is also known for its narrow north-west spur, called The Bone.  It is part of the MacGillycuddy's Reeks in Kerry.

Geography 

Maolán Buí is in the eastern part of the MacGillycuddy's Reeks in County Kerry, Ireland's highest mountain range.  The peak lies on a ridge between Cnoc na Péiste  (to the northeast) and Cnoc an Chuillinn  (to the southwest), which are themselves part of the larger eastern ridge of the Reeks, which includes The Big Gun  and finishes at its far eastern end with Cruach Mhór . 

A narrow north-west spur of Maolán Buí called The Bone, not to be confused with the nearby peak that sits on the Beenkeragh Ridge, The Bones , is regarded as a safe escape route from the eastern section of the main MacGillycuddy's Reeks ridge, down into the Hag's Glen and out through Cronin's Yard.  

Maolán Buí is the 278th-highest mountain in Britain and Ireland on the Simm classification. It is regarded by the Scottish Mountaineering Club ("SMC") as one of 34 Furths, which is a mountain above  in elevation, and meets the other SMC criteria for a Munro (e.g. "sufficient separation"), but which is outside of (or furth) Scotland; which is why Maolán Buí is sometimes referred to as one of the 13 Irish Munros.  

Maolán Buí's prominence qualifies it to meet the Arderin classification, and the British Isles Simm and Hewitt classifications.

See also 

 Lists of mountains in Ireland
 List of mountains of the British Isles by height
 List of Furth mountains in the British Isles

References

External links
MountainViews: The Irish Mountain Website
MountainViews: Irish Online Mountain Database
The Database of British and Irish Hills , the largest database of British Isles mountains ("DoBIH")
Hill Bagging UK & Ireland, the searchable interface for the DoBIH
Ordnance Survey Ireland ("OSI") Online Map Viewer
Logainm: Placenames Database of Ireland

Mountains and hills of County Kerry
Furths
Mountains under 1000 metres